The Australian College of Nursing (ACN) is the peak professional body and voice for the nursing profession in Australia. ACN advocates, develops policy, and provides education to advance the status, recognition, and respect for nursing nationally and internationally. 

ACN was established in 2012 from the unification of its predecessor organisations, the Royal College of Nursing, Australia, and The College of Nursing (previously New South Wales College of Nursing). Both had a rich history of championing the nursing profession since 1949.  

ACN is the Australian member of the International Council of Nurses (ICN) in collaboration with the Australian Nursing and Midwifery Federation (ANMF).

Mission
ACN is committed to ‘Shaping Health, Advancing Nursing’ to enhance the health care of all Australians. ACN does this by advocating for the nursing profession, creating an engaged community of nurses, offering world-class education, preparing nurses to lead, representing the profession in policy development and driving social impact.

Presidents 

 Carmen Morgan FACN (2013-2015)
 Adjunct Professor Kathy Baker AM FACN (DLF) (2016)
 Emeritus Professor Christine Duffield FACN (2017-present)

Chief Executive Officers 

 Adjunct Professor Debra Thoms FACN DLF (2012-2015)
 Adjunct Professor Kylie Ward FACN (2015-present)

Advocacy
ACN advocates at State and Federal levels and shares valuable insights and recommendations to ensure the collective nursing voice is heard.

ACN has 23 specialty Faculties that inform specific areas of practice by connecting like-minded ACN Fellows and Members, which are:

 Adolescent & Young People       
 Advanced Practice          
 Chief Nursing Informatics Officers
 Climate & Health             
 Clinical Research Nurses              
 Chronic Disease
 Cosmetic-Dermatology Nursing
 Disaster Health
 End of Life Care
 Enrolled Nurses
 First Nations      
 Global Nursing 
 Healthy Ageing
 History
 Leadership
 Legal & Ethical Issues
 Military Nursing
 National Nursing Executive
 Next Generation
 Nurse Informatics & Digital Health
 Nursing in the Community
 Nursing Regulation
 Rural and Remote Nursing.

Policy Summit 
The ACN Policy Summit is an annual forum where high-profile nurses and health policy advocates connect in Canberra to address significant policy issues for nursing and health care. The Summit brings together nurses and other health professionals to identify and discuss major policy opportunities and strategies to address these.

Notes

External links
website

Nursing schools in Australia
Education in Sydney
Distance education institutions based in Australia
Educational institutions established in 1949
1949 establishments in Australia
National Rural Health Alliance organisations